Ozark Trail may refer to:
 Ozark Trail (hiking trail), a hiking and backpacking trail in Missouri
 Ozark Highlands Trail, a hiking and backpacking trail in Arkansas
 Ozark Trail (auto trail), an early network of locally maintained roads and highways
 Ozark Trail (brand name), a private-label brand name owned by Wal-Mart